The discography of 3OH!3, an American electropop group, contains six studio albums, four extended plays and 11 singles. They are best known for their single "Don't Trust Me" from their album Want, which reached number seven on the Billboard Hot 100. Their second single, a remix of "Starstrukk" featuring Katy Perry from Want, was a top ten hit in the United Kingdom, Ireland, Finland, and Australia. They gained further recognition by featuring Kesha on the song "My First Kiss", which was made the lead single from their album Streets of Gold. The album later peaked at number seven on the Billboard 200.

Studio albums

Extended plays

Singles

As lead artist

As featured artist

Promotional singles

Other charted songs

Other appearances

Music videos

As lead artist

As featured artist

References

Discographies of American artists